Talacogon, officially the Municipality of Talacogon,  is a 2nd class municipality in the province of Agusan del Sur, Philippines. According to the 2020 census, it has a population of 39,678 people.

History 
Talacogon got its name from the cogon grass that is abundant in the area. It was called so by the natives who inhabit the area before the entry of the Spanish in the Agusan River basin sometime in the 18th century. The Spanish who came in the area then adopted the name of the place as they founded it as a town in the 13th of November 1872, building a church and a town hall as commemoration to its founding. It was thus the first town founded in the riverbanks of the Agusan River and the oldest town in the province of Agusan del Sur.

As the years went on, Talacogon only experienced slow progress due to its inaccessibility and remoteness to other parts of Mindanao. It was only in the 1970s to 1990's that roads begun being built in the area from which the municipality then experienced rapid progress, due in part to facilitate the logging business in the area.

Being a town since 1872, Talacogon remains the economic center of the province west of the Agusan River.

Geography

According to the Philippine Statistics Authority, the municipality has a land area of  constituting  of the  total area of Agusan del Sur.

Climate

Barangays
Talacogon is politically subdivided into 16 barangays.

Demographics

In the 2020 census, Talacogon had a population of 39,678.

Economy

References

External links
 [ Philippine Standard Geographic Code]

Municipalities of Agusan del Sur